The Mid Murray Football Association  was an Australian rules football competition based in the western Riverland region of South Australia, Australia. It operated for 100 years, from 1910 to 2009. It was an affiliated member of the South Australian National Football League.

Brief history 
The Mid-Murray Football Association was formed in 1910 with founding clubs being Kingston, Morgan, and Waikerie.

2006 Ladder																	
																	

FINALS

2007 Ladder																	
																	

FINALS

2008 Ladder																	
																	

FINALS

2009 Ladder																	
																	

FINALS

Football League to disband
From late 2009 to early 2010, Robertstown merged with North Eastern Football League club Eudunda, with the new club competing as the Southern Saints in the NEFL from 2010. This followed the move of Sedan Cambrai to the Hills Football League, leaving the league with only two clubs and deciding to disband. The Association issued a press release on its website announcing the league's disbandment.

Blanchetown/Swan Reach were later accepted into the Riverland Independent Football League.

On 19 October 2017, the Mid-Murray Football Association Incorporated was officially deregistered as an incorporated association by the Corporate Affairs Commission.

Final clubs 
 Blanchetown Swan Reach Football Club
 Morgan Cadell Football Club
 Robertstown Football Club
 Sedan Cambrai Football Club

References

External links 
country footy

Books
 Encyclopedia of South Australian country football clubs / compiled by Peter Lines. 
 South Australian country football digest / by Peter Lines 

Defunct Australian rules football competitions in South Australia
Riverland
1910 establishments in Australia
2009 disestablishments in Australia